Dmitriy Horlin is a visually impaired Uzbekistani Paralympic swimmer. He represented Uzbekistan at the 2016 Summer Paralympics in Rio de Janeiro, Brazil and he won the bronze medal in the men's 400 metre freestyle S13 event.

At the 2015 IPC Swimming World Championships held in Glasgow, United Kingdom, he won the bronze medal in the men's 400 metre freestyle S13 event.

He competed at the 2019 World Para Swimming Championships held in London, United Kingdom in several events. He did not win a medal on this occasion.

References

External links 
 

Living people
Year of birth missing (living people)
Place of birth missing (living people)
Uzbekistani male freestyle swimmers
Paralympic swimmers with a vision impairment
Paralympic swimmers of Uzbekistan
S12-classified Paralympic swimmers
Swimmers at the 2016 Summer Paralympics
Medalists at the 2016 Summer Paralympics
Paralympic bronze medalists for Uzbekistan
Medalists at the World Para Swimming Championships
Paralympic medalists in swimming
21st-century Uzbekistani people
Uzbekistani blind people